Somesh Mathur (born in 1964) is an Indian singer, songwriter and music producer.

Career
Mathur has released 21 albums and 43 music videos; 'Ghalib', 'Jai Ganesha', 'Shiva Shlokas', & 'Radhai Ram Radhai Shyam', and the recent Indi-American hit, "Time Stood Still". He composed over 200 songs in a wide range of genres, and he performed over 1600 concerts worldwide.  
He also received the MTV Video Music Award (2005–2006) for his album with Asha Bhosle, Asha - A Brand New Album, for the song "Aaj Jaane Ki Zid Na Karo". He is the first Indian to be inducted as a mentor and a voting member at the Recording Academy, an American learned academy of musicians, producers, and other musical professionals.

References

External links
 https://www.grammy.com/recording-academy/member/fyc/30-new-age-album/somesh-mathur-featuring-rochana-dahanukar
 https://www.grammy.com/recording-academy/member/fyc/2-al
 https://www.grammy.com/recording-academy/member/fyc/83-music-video/somesh-mathurbum-year/somesh-mathur
 ONLINE CONCERTS in COVID-19
 http://www.maestromathur.com
 Jazz Weekly review (15 March 2019)
 Sound in Review review 16 March 2019
 Somesh Mathur feat. Scott Kinsey: Time Stood Still
 Rootsville
 Somesh Mathur - Time Stood Still - Produced by Scott Kinsey
 https://play.google.com/store/music/album?id=Bk2ekrywfiheu2ijdyjgjrgeyuu
 Roots Music Report: Top 50 World Album Chart
 11/06/18 - Midwest Record - Entertainment Reviews, News, and Views
 https://www.grammy.com/recording-academy/member/fyc/2-album-year/somesh-mathur-featuring-scott-kinsey
 Somesh Mathur feat. Scott Kinsey: Time Stood Still Keys and Chords review
 Somesh Mathur's Time Stood StillSomesh Mathur Time Stood Still

1977 births
Living people
Indian male composers
Indian male singer-songwriters
Indian singer-songwriters
Indian record producers
Thumri